Tomás is a Spanish, Portuguese, or Irish  surname, equivalent of Thomas.

It may refer to:

 Antonio Tomás (born 1985), professional Spanish footballer
 Belarmino Tomás (1892–1950), Asturian trade unionist and socialist politician
 Fray Tomás de Berlanga (1487–1551), fourth bishop of Panama
 Joan Tomás Campasol (born 1985), Spanish footballer
 João Tomás (born 1975), Portuguese footballer
 José Tomás Boves (1782–1814), Spanish military leader in the Venezuelan war of Independence
 José Tomás Ovalle (circa 1788–1831), Chilean political figure
 José Tomás Sánchez (born 1920), Roman Catholic archbishop and Cardinal Priest
 José Tomás (1934–2001), Spanish classical guitarist and teacher
 Juan Tomás Ávila Laurel (born 1966), Annobonese writer
 Juan Tomás de Rocaberti (circa 1624–1699), Spanish theologian
 Raúl de Tomás (born 1994), Spanish football player

Spanish-language surnames
Portuguese-language surnames
Surnames from given names